The Wey barge was based on the earlier West Country barge designs and the first barges built specifically for use on the Wey were probably built at Honeystreet Wharf, near Devizes. The earliest that this could be was 1810 as the Kennet and Avon Canal was opened through to the Thames that year.

Barge building
There is little evidence of barge building on the Wey before 1876.  Many of the barges used before then were constructed at the Honeystreet Wharf near Devizes.  The Kennet and Avon Canal opened in 1810 which  allowed the passage of barges  to enter the Thames and thus the Wey.  The first barges from here to be used on the Wey were known as "West Country" or "Western" barges which were designed to be used on the western waterways such as the Kennet and Avon Canal and the Thames and Severn Canal. These became the standard for the Wey Navigation.

Around 1876 the Edwards family moved from Honeystreet to Dapdune Wharf setting up a barge building business.  The Surrey Advertiser published an article in 1909 on the launch of the barge Dapdune built by George Edwards and his three sons.

Types of barges
The main method of propulsion on the navigation was by horse.  Barges were rowed, sailed or towed by larger vessels from the various London quays to Thames Lock at Weybridge where they were 'horsed up' for a price of 9/6d.:
The sizes of these barges were determined by the size of the locks they needed to travel through.  These were

Construction

The barges were generally a flat structure with a small cabin at the stern and a locker in the bows for stowing ropes and other equipment. The cargo hold was covered by either wooden hatches or a canvas tarpaulin which were held above the cargo by the hatch beam.

The boats were built in a large shed at the north end of the wharf. The ribs of the hull were built from oak. There was a steam chest behind the shed where the wood could be shaped. However the Edwards family preferred to find wood naturally shaped.

The hull was planked with pitch pine. Pitch pine was used because it was lightweight and came in long lengths so required less joints. Elm was tried, and although it was more water resistant, it was heavier and therefore the barge had a lower cargo capacity. The gaps between the planks were sealed by caulking, a process involving mixing a fibrous substance, often unpicked old rope, with tar and ramming the mixture into the joints while the tar was hot.

The barge was flat bottomed and straight sided, this meant that it could operate in shallow water with a reasonable cargo, also it could be safely grounded in tidal waters. Once the hull was complete it was covered in pitch to create a watertight finish. The barge was built on trestles to keep it off the ground and assist in launching.  Only the hull was built in the shed. On completion the water side of the shed was removed and the barge was launched sideways into the river. The barge was then towed up to the area where the pleasure boats are moored today and it was here that fitting out was completed. This was also the area used to repair barges.

A barge would have only inches to spare when going through the lock. They could carry 80 tonnes of cargo from the Thames to Coxes mill. From Coxes going upstream the capacity was reduced to 50 tonnes as far as Guildford and further reduced for the journey to Godalming owing to the decrease in the depth of water available.

Barges of the Wey Navigations
Over time there have been many barges, each with its own name. Names were reused, such as Perseverance which has been used on four different barges.

Usage
The Wey and Godalming Navigations was a major distribution route for the distribution of goods in south England and along with the  Wey and Arun Canal it provided an inland route from London to the South Coast.  The goods transported varied from gunpowder from the Gunpowder Mills at Chilworth to more usual raw materials such as timber, coal, grain and wool.  The amount of goods that could be carried was governed by the size of the barges used which were restricted by the size of the locks in the various waterways.  As each waterway was constructed and owned by a different company the size of the locks varied.

References

Barges
Wey catchment